Dublin, Wicklow and Wexford Railway (DW&WR) 52 to 54 were a class of three 4-4-2T locomotives designed by William Wakefield for Kingstown Pier to Kingsbridge (Dublin Heuston) boat trains.  At one point they carried the names Duke of Connaught, Duke of Abercorn and Duke of Leinster respectively.

Ahrons describes them as the larger than other types at the time of their introduction in 1893.  They seem to have been generally well balanced and successful engines, though it was noted that they had a reverse level and could become problematic and even unsafe when worn.  Unlike the subsequent Dublin and South Eastern Railway's (DSER) 4-4-2Ts it had no apparent problems with trains on gradients.  On the 1925 amalgamation to Great Southern Railways (GSR) in 1925 they became numbers 458, 460 and 459 of GSR Class 458/C3.  In  GSR rebuilt No. 460 with a lower pitched boiler and a forward cab extension, it being the only locomotive not re-boilered by the DSER.  The last in service, No. 460, was withdrawn in 1960, the others having been withdrawn in the preceding decade.

A 1948 report for C.I.É. had assessed the engines as "DSER heavy passenger engines — quite good even with certain inherent troubles".

Notes and references

Notes

References

4-4-2T locomotives
5 ft 3 in gauge locomotives
Railway locomotives introduced in 1893
Scrapped locomotives
Steam locomotives of Ireland